Hoằng Hóa is a district (huyện) of Thanh Hóa province in the North Central Coast region of Vietnam. As of 2003 the district had a population of 250,864. The district covers an area of 225 km². The district capital is in Bút Sơn.

Administration 
Hoang Hoa district has 37 affiliated commune-level administrative units, including Bút Sơn (district town) and 36 communes:

References

Districts of Thanh Hóa province